Phil Murphy (born 1 April 1980, Beverley, Humberside, England) is an English rugby union player for Leeds Tykes in the Guinness Premiership. Murphy plays as a lock.

He also played (on loan) for Wakefield RFC during the 2002/03 season.

References

1980 births
Living people
English rugby union players
Leeds Tykes players
Rugby union players from Beverley
Wakefield RFC players
Rugby union locks